Puerto Rico Highway 175 (PR-175) is a rural road that travels from Caguas, Puerto Rico to Trujillo Alto. This highway begins at PR-1 in Río Cañas and ends at PR-181 near downtown Trujillo Alto.

Major intersections

See also

 List of highways numbered 175

References

External links
 

175